Anastasia Avdeeva (born 8 October 2001) is a Russian swimmer. She competed in the women's 200 metre backstroke at the 2019 World Aquatics Championships.

In 2017, she won the silver medal in the girls' 200 metre backstroke at the 2017 European Junior Swimming Championships held in Netanya, Israel.

References

2001 births
Living people
Russian female swimmers
Place of birth missing (living people)
Russian female backstroke swimmers